Allama Muztar Abbasi (1931 – 26 February 2004) was a Pakistani Muslim scholar who belonged to the Dhund Abbasi tribe of Murree Hills in the Rawalpindi District. He was a Founder of the Esperanto language in Europe. He was patron in chief of the Pakistan Esperanto Association (PakEsA). He translated the Quran into Esperanto and wrote a biography of Muhammad and several other books in Esperanto and Urdu.

Works

Abbasi, Muztar: Unua Esperanto Libro (Urdu-Esperanto) in 1974
Abbasi, Muztar: Baza Esperanto-Urdu Leglibro (Urdu-Esperanto) in 1976
Abbasi, Muztar: Esperanto-Urdu vortaro (Urdu-Esperanto) in 1977
Abbasi, Muztar: Baza Kurslibro de Esperanto (Urdu-Esperanto) in 1978
Abbasi, Muztar: Dua Baza Kurslibro de Esperanto (Urdu-Esperanto) in 1982
Abbasi, Muztar: Baza Vortaro de Esp-Urdu (Urdu-Esperanto) in 1882
Abbasi, Muztar: S-ro Muhammad (benita de Allah) la vivo de Islamo (Esperanto) in 1984
Abbasi, Muztar: Facila Esperanto Vortaro en Urdu (Urdu-Esperanto) in 1985
Abbasi, Muztar: Leciono el la Nobla Kuraano (Dars-e-Kuraan) in 1990
Abbasi, Muztar: Vera Libro Traduko de Kuraano (Esperanto) in 1992
Abbasi, Muztar: Lingvaj interrilatoj de Araba kaj Hebrea (Urdu) in 1993
Abbasi, Muztar: Esperanto-Urdu Vortaro (Urdu-Esperanto) in 1998
Abbasi, Muztar: Tezo pri Islamo (Esperanto) in 2000
Abbasi, Muztar: Profeto Muhammad (benita de Allah) Diris (Esperanto, Araba kaj Urdua) in 2002
Abbasi, Muztar: La Sankta Kuraano (Translate in Esperanto) in 2000

References

Pakistani scholars
Pakistani Esperantists
1931 births
2004 deaths
Translators from Arabic
Quran translators
Translators to Esperanto
People from Murree
20th-century translators
Esperanto–Urdu translators
Urdu–Esperanto translators